Badrabad-e Sofla (also Romanized as Badrābād-e Soflá; also known as Badrābād) is a village in Koregah-e Gharbi Rural District, in the Central District of Khorramabad County, Lorestan Province, Iran. At the 2006 census, its population was 1,293, in 266 families.

References 

Towns and villages in Khorramabad County